John Ruskin (born July 5, 1968), better known as Nardwuar or Nardwuar the Human Serviette, is a Canadian interviewer and musician. He is the lead singer and keyboardist for the Evaporators.

Nardwuar got his start in media at the University of British Columbia radio station CITR 101.9 FM in Vancouver. His show has been running every Friday afternoon since October 1987. The program features a mix of eclectic music, along with interviews and commentary. Nardwuar's interviews have frequently been shown on MuchMusic's Going Coastal, or printed in Chart. Although Nardwuar's favorite targets are music artists, he has stated that he will interview any celebrity. He also sometimes appears as a guest host and interviewer on CBC Radio 3 and started his own weekly program on freeform radio station WFMU which ran from 2009 to 2013.

Noted for his excitable persona, a typical Nardwuar interview will begin with "Who are you?", followed by "From?" if the subject doesn't volunteer their affiliations. Each interview ends with "Keep on rockin' in the free world", and the "doot doola doot doo ..." of "Shave and a Haircut", to which the interviewee is expected to reply with the final "doot doo!" before Nardwuar freezes with a wide smile until the camera cuts off. Interviews also often end with Nardwuar asking the interviewee "Why should people care about [interviewee's name]?". When asked to explain his name, Nardwuar has said it is "a dumb, stupid name like Sting or Sinbad"; that "Human" came from the song "Human Fly" by the Cramps; and that "Serviette" came from the fact that "in the U.S.A. they don't have serviettes, they have napkins".

Early life
Nardwuar was born John Ruskin in Vancouver in 1968. His father, Vernon, was an engineer and his mother Olga Ruskin (née Bruchovsky) was a local journalist, high school history teacher and historian. She published a history of Vancouver historical figure "Gassy Jack" John Deighton. His mother exposed him to local history by bringing him to historical society meetups. In elementary school, Nardwuar won a public speaking competition and was a long-distance runner.

Nardwuar attended Hillside Secondary School in West Vancouver, where he was a member of the student council.  Through the student council, he began booking bands for school events and conducted his first interview with Art Bergmann of Poisoned. He was accepted into the University of British Columbia (UBC) in 1986, the same year he changed his name to Nardwuar.  He began volunteering at the campus radio station, CITR.  While studying history at UBC, Nardwuar wrote papers on Vancouver's Lions Gate Bridge and the assassination of John F. Kennedy. He graduated in 1990 with a bachelor's degree in history.

Career

Interviews with musicians
Nardwuar does extensive research on the interviewee. During an interview with Pharrell Williams from N.E.R.D., Nardwuar pulled out a vinyl record featuring the very first recorded track by Pharrell, causing him to pause and say, "This is... this is... This is one of the most impressive interviews I've ever experienced in my life. Seriously." Later in the same interview, Pharrell said, "Your research is second-to-none. Second-to-none."  During a 2010 interview with rapper Drake and his producer 40, Drake described Nardwuar's interview as the "best that I've ever done in my entire life".

Due to his absurd and eccentric style, he has been attacked verbally, physically threatened, and intimidated by people such as Sebastian Bach of Skid Row (who stole Nardwuar's favorite toque). Alice Cooper, Henry Rollins, Travis Barker, Lydia Lunch, Harlan Ellison, Beck, Nas, and others have hung up on him or been verbally combative in interviews. Dave Rowntree of Blur apologized to Nardwuar in 2011 for his behavior during a 2003 interview, calling it "one of the things I'm ashamed of" and classified his actions as "bullying". Nardwuar accepted the apology via Twitter.

Interviews with non-musicians 
Nardwuar has also been known to be a "guerrilla journalist," often sneaking into press conferences under the guise of an orthodox reporter to confront political leaders or other non-musical celebrities with surreal or confusing questions. His non-Canadian political targets have included former President of the Soviet Union Mikhail Gorbachev, former U.S. President Gerald Ford and former U.S. Vice President Dan Quayle. Nardwuar has also targeted actor Crispin Glover and faith healer Ernest Angley, asking the latter if there was a cure for "the Summertime Blues", to which Angley angrily replied, "Oh I wish you would shut up, man. You know you're not even funny. You're lucky God don't strike you dead."

Interviews with Canadian politicians 
In November 1997, he cut off all his hair and was able to sneak into an APEC conference to ask Jean Chrétien if he supported the pepper spraying of protesters outside. Chrétien, apparently unaware of the incident and not knowing what the English terms "mace" and "pepper spray" referred to, responded with a line that has become well-known in Canada: "For me, pepper, I put it on my plate."

In June 2004, Nardwuar convinced an amused Paul Martin, former Prime Minister of Canada, to play a quick game of the Hasbro game "Hip Flip" while he was on the campaign trail.  After Martin won the election, Nardwuar commented on the great predictive power of the "Hip Flip," because neither of the other two candidates had performed the act. On a campaign trip to Vancouver in December 2005, Nardwuar concluded an interview with the late New Democratic Party leader Jack Layton—who, in their first encounter, had taken the instructions to the game and said he would practice for their next encounter—with a successful, coordinated, swinging of their hips. The 22nd Prime Minister Stephen Harper is the only major candidate from the 2004 election who has never performed a successful "Hip Flip" with Nardwuar. Nardwuar was escorted out by Harper's security while trying to initiate the game. In the 2015 Canadian federal election, the first federal leader to complete the Hip Flip game was Justin Trudeau, who did so on September 10 after a press conference in Vancouver.

Premier Christy Clark (Liberal), Premier John Horgan (NDP) and Andrew Weaver (Green)  all did the Hip Flip during the 2017 British Columbia general election.

During the 2019 Canadian federal election, New Democratic Party leader Jagmeet Singh was the only head of a political party to attempt the Hip Flip.  

In the 2021 Canadian federal election campaign, both New Democratic Party leader Jagmeet Singh  and Green Party of Canada leader Annamie Paul completed the Hip Flip.

Legacy
The music video for the 2005 Korn song  "Twisted Transistor" is a mockumentary that includes a fictional documentary filmmaker named "Rob Piner", whose behavior and appearance are based on Nardwuar.

In January 2013, Brother Ali released a song called "Nardwuar", to commemorate his interview with Nardwuar; the song features a beat taken from one of the records that Nardwuar gave Ali as a gift.

At the 2013 South by Southwest Festival film director Brent Hodge and producer Chris Kelly did a retrospective of Nardwuar's career for Time. Pharrell Williams playfully turned the tables and interviewed Nardwuar immediately after his own interview, imitating Nardwuar's signature style.

In his 2013 mixtape Innanetape, Vic Mensa referenced Nardwuar in the song "Tweakin' (feat. Chance the Rapper)" with the lyric "Thumbs up to the camera like Nardwuar."

While Nardwuar was recovering from heart surgery, Kyle Mooney produced a mock Nardwuar interview with Matt Mondanile.

On his 2016 album Top of the Line, in the song of the same name, Rittz references Nardwuar with the lyric "shit I can't recall the last 15 years wishing I could do an interview with Nardwuar".

The track "Night Song" from the 2017 EP Brothers of Destruction by The Lemon Twigs has the line "we saw the highway patrol taking selfies with Nardwuar."

September 29, 2019, was declared "Nardwuar Day" in Vancouver by Kennedy Stewart, the Mayor of Vancouver.

In 2019, Nardwuar was inducted into the BC Entertainment Hall of Fame and included in their star walk on Granville Street in Downtown Vancouver.

Lil Uzi Vert sampled his 2018 interview with Nardwuar for his song "Futsal Shuffle 2020".

The track "Merlin's Staff" off the 2021 mixtape, Sin City The Mixtape, by Ski Mask the Slump God has the line "They all about ya, know about ya, no Nardwuar".

Logic's 2022 album, Vinyl Days, features a track called "Nardwuar" in which an audio from Nardwuar himself is sampled.

 Macklemore's 2022 song Maniac features a cameo appearance from Nardwuar. He is also referred to in the lyrics.

Quavo & Takeoff's (rappers) 2022 song "Tony Starks", on album Only Built for Infinity Links has the line "They keep askin' questions, like they Nardwuar".

Personal life
On July 10, 1999, Nardwuar suffered seizures and temporary paralysis resulting from a cerebral hemorrhage (aborting his planned ambush interview of Courtney Love), but he quickly recovered.

On December 6, 2015, Nardwuar suffered a stroke and was released from hospital six days later. On January 25, 2016, Nardwuar underwent surgical repair of a patent foramen ovale, a hole between two chambers of the heart, which was the likely cause of his stroke.

References

External links
 Nardwuar.com
 Nardwuar's user page on Youtube.com
 An episode of Olga Ruskin's show, Our Pioneers and Neighbours

1968 births
Living people
Musicians from Vancouver
Canadian rock singers
Canadian male singers
Canadian rock keyboardists
Canadian radio personalities
Much (TV channel) personalities
University of British Columbia alumni
Mint Records artists
American radio DJs
Alternative Tentacles artists
Canadian music journalists